Asahi (朝日, 旭, or あさひ) means "morning sun" in Japanese and may refer to:

Cities
 Asahi, Chiba (旭市; Asahi-shi)

Wards
 Asahi-ku, Osaka (旭区; Asahi-ku)
 Asahi-ku, Yokohama (旭; Asahi-ku)

Towns
 Asahi, Aichi (旭町; Asahi-chō)
 Asahi, Fukui (朝日町; Asahi-chō)
 Asahi, Hokkaido (朝日町; Asahi-chō)
 Asahi, Mie (朝日町; Asahi-chō)
 Asahi, Okayama (旭町; Asahi-chō)
 Asahi, Shimane (旭町; Asahi-chō)
 Asahi, Toyama (朝日町; Asahi-machi)
 Asahi, Yamagata (Nishimurayama) (朝日町; Asahi-machi)

Villages
 Asahi, Gifu (朝日村; Asahi-mura)
 Asahi, Ibaraki (旭村; Asahi-mura)
 Asahi, Nagano (朝日村; Asahi-mura)
 Asahi, Niigata (朝日村; Asahi-mura)
 Asahi, Yamagata (Tagawa) (朝日村; Asahi-mura)
 Asahi, Yamaguchi (旭村; Asahi-son)

Companies
 Asahi Breweries, a Japanese beverage company
 Asahi Shimbun, a Japanese newspaper
 Asahi Production, a Japanese animation company
 TV Asahi, a Japanese television network
 Asahi Glass Company, a Japanese chemical products manufacturer
 Asahi Optical Corporation, now known as Pentax Corporation
 Asahi Kasei, a Japanese chemical products manufacturer
 Asahi Metal Industry Co. v. Superior Court, a U.S. Supreme Court case (1987)
 Asahi Broadcasting Corporation (ABC), a radio and television broadcaster in the Kansai region, Japan

People
, Japanese footballer
, Japanese announcer
, Japanese footballer
, Japanese footballer
, Japanese volleyball player
, Japanese singer, member of South Korean band Treasure

Other 
 Asahi (automobile), a 1930s Japanese automobile
 Asahi (motorcycle), a Japanese motorcycle brand
 Asahi (train), a Japanese train service name
 Japanese battleship Asahi
 Asahi Health, a Finnish health exercise
 Asahi (baseball team), a Japanese-Canadian baseball team
 Asahi Azumane (東峰 旭), a character from Haikyu!! with the position of wing spiker from Karasuno High
 Asahi Gakuen (あさひ学園) Los Angeles Japanese School
 Asahi River (旭川), a river in Okayama Prefecture, Japan
 Asahi Linux, an initiative to port Linux to recent Apple devices
 "Asahi", a song by Animals as Leaders from the album Parrhesia
 Asahi University, a private university in Mizuho, Gifu Prefecture, Japan

See also
 Asachi, a surname
 Hinode (disambiguation), Japanese word for "sunrise"

Japanese-language surnames
Japanese masculine given names